The 2013–14 SK Rapid Wien season was the 116th season in club history.

Matches

Legend

Bundesliga

League results and fixtures

League table

Overall league table

Summary table

ÖFB-Cup

UEFA Europa League

Third qualifying round

Play-off round

Group stage

Group results

Group table

Squad

Squad, appearances and goals

Source:

Starting XI
Considering starts in all competitions.

Goal scorers

Transfers

Summer 

In:

Out:

Winter 

In:

Out:

Sources 

Rapid Wien
Rapid Wien
2013-14 Rapid Wien Season